Badejo Field is an offshore oil field in Brazil. Above of it is laying partly the Membro Siri (sometimes referred just as Siri) extra heavy crude oil field with and 12.8° API gravity. Oil was discovered in the Membro Siri reservoir in 1975, but was considered uneconomical to develop this time.

In 2008 the FPSO Petrojarl Cidade de Rio das Ostras started test production of the Siri crude.  Part of the process equipment on the FPSO is an electrostatic coalescer  with the VIEC technology from Hamworthy.  The process system was delivered by Expro.  It consists of two separator stages and the electrostatic coalescer.  Using high processing temperature the process system is designed to output crude oil with an export specification of 1% BS&W.

External links

Presentation of the Petrojarl Cidade De Rio Das Ostras
Teekay Petrojarl, presentation
Hamworthy’s VIEC technology
Expro's solution for the process system

Oil fields of Brazil
Campos Basin
Petrobras oil and gas fields